Nopparat Sakul-oad (born  March 12, 1986), is a Thai professional footballer who plays as a centre-back for Banbueng.

Honour
Nongbua Pitchaya
 Thai League 2 Champions : 2020–21

References

External links
 https://int.soccerway.com/players/nopparat-sakul-oad/474166/
https://www.livesoccer888.com/thaipremierleague/teams/Pattaya-United/Players/Nopparat-Sakul-oad

1986 births
Living people
Nopparat Sakul-oad
Nopparat Sakul-oad
Association football central defenders
Nopparat Sakul-oad
Nopparat Sakul-oad
Nopparat Sakul-oad
Nopparat Sakul-oad
Nopparat Sakul-oad